Poggi may refer to:

 Poggi, an Italian surname
 Palazzo Poggi, a palace in Bologna, Italy

See also
 Poggio (disambiguation)